Omer Avital (born May 13, 1971, Givatayim, Israel) is an Israeli-American jazz bassist, composer and bandleader.

Early life 
Avital was born in the town of Givatayim to Moroccan and Yemeni parents. At age 11, he began his formal training, studying classical guitar at the Givatayim Conservatory. Upon entering Thelma Yellin, Israel's leading high school for the arts, Avital switched to acoustic bass and began studying and arranging jazz.

When he was 17, Avital began playing professionally in jazz, pop, and folk music bands, as well as performing regularly on national television, radio, and in jazz festivals. He spent a year in the Israeli Army Orchestra and then moved to New York in 1992 where he began playing, recording, and touring professionally.

Career
After arriving in New York in 1992, Avital began playing in groups with Roy Haynes, Jimmy Cobb, Nat Adderley, Walter Bishop, Jr., Al Foster, Kenny Garrett, Steve Grossman, Jimmy Lovelace, and Rashied Ali. In 1994, he began collaborating with pianist Jason Lindner, with whom Avital began leading his own groups and big band during the after-hours sessions at Smalls Jazz Club in Greenwich Village.

In 1995 and 1996, Avital made an impact on the New York jazz scene with a series of breakout piano-less groups at the original Smalls Jazz Club, including a classic sextet with four saxophones, bass and drums, alternately included saxophonists Myron Walden, Mark Turner, Gregory Tardy, Joel Frahm, Charles Owens, Grant Stewart, Jay Collins and Jimmy Greene, and drummers Ali Jackson, Joe Strasser and Daniel Freedman. He was the subject of frequent features in The New York Times.

A number of these sessions were recorded and released under the Smalls record label. In 1997, Impulse! Records produced the compilation Jazz Underground: Live at Smalls, which featured several recordings of Avital's quartet. He signed to record his debut album, Devil Head, the following year, but it was never issued.

In 2001, Avital released his debut album, Think With Your Heart, featuring Gregory Tardy, Jay Collins, Myron Walden, Joel Frahm, Jimmy Greene, Joshua Levitt, Daniel Freedman and Marlon Browden.

In 2003, Avital returned to Israel, where for three years he studied classical composition, Arabic music theory, oud, and traditional Israeli music.

In 2005, Avital returned to New York and released three albums, including two from the Smalls recording archives and a fourth with the group Third World Love.

In 2006, Avital's album Asking No Permission was named to many best ten lists.   "So we weren't crazy," wrote Ben Ratliff in the New York Times, "finally, here's proof that Omer Avital's sextet, which played at Smalls to a small but deep following in the late 90s, really was good." .

In 2009, Avital and Ravid Kahalani formed Yemen Blues, a world music ensemble that combines Yemenite music with funk, blues and jazz. In 2011, Yemen Blues released their debut album, Yemen Blues. Avital served as the producer and arranger in addition to playing the bass and oud. He remained with Yemen Blues until 2012.

Avital released two albums in 2012, one with Aaron Goldberg and Ali Jackson, Jr. as Yes! Trio and another, Suite of the East, which was met with critical acclaim and was named Best Album of 2012 by the radio station TSF Jazz.

In 2013, he released his album New Song on the French label, Plus Loin Music. New Song was released in the U.S. on November 4, 2014 on Motéma Music. Avital's album Abutbul Music was released worldwide in March 2016 on the Paris-based Jazz Village label by Harmonia Mundi.

Awards and honors
 Prime Minister's Award, Israel, 2008
 ASCAP Foundation Vanguard Award, 2011

Discography
As leader

 Think With Your Heart (2001)
 Arrival (2006)
 Asking No Permission (2006)
 The Ancient Art of Giving (2006)
 Room to Grow (2007)
 Free Forever (2011)
 Live at Smalls (2011)
 Suite of the East (2012)
 New Song (Motéma Music, 2014)
 Abutbul Music (Harmonia Mundi, 2016)
 Qantar (Zamzama Records, 2018)
 Qantar: New York Paradox (Zamzama Records, 2020)

As co-leader/sideman

With Third World Love
 Songs and Portraits (2012)
 New Blues (2008)
 Sketch of Tel Aviv (2006)
 Avanim (2004)
 Third World Love Songs (2002)

With Yes! Trio (Aaron Goldberg and Ali Jackson, Jr.)
 Yes! (2012)
 Groove du jour (2019)

With New Jerusalem Orchestra
 Ahavat Olamim (2011)

With Yemen Blues
 Yemen Blues (2011)

With Debka Fantasia
 Debka Fantasia (2009)

With Anat Cohen
 Notes from the Village (2008)
 Poetica (2007)

With Marlon Browden
 The Omer Avital Marlon Browden Project (2005)

With OAM Trio (Aaron Goldberg and Marc Miralta)
 Now & Here (2005)
 Live in Sevilla (With Mark Turner) (2003)
 Flow (2002)
 Trilingual (1999)

With Avishai Cohen
 Dark Nights (2014)
 Triveni II (2012)
 Introducing Triveni (2010)
 After The Big Rain (2007)

With Claudia Acuña
 En Este Momento (2009)

With Omer Klein
 Introducing Omer Klein (2008)

With 3 Cohens (Anat, Avishai and Yuval Cohen)
 Braid (2007)

With Jason Lindner
 Live at the Jazz Gallery (2007)
 Ab Aeterno (2006)
 Live/UK (2004)
 Premonition (2000)

With Daniel Freedman
 Daniel Freedman Trio (2002)
 Bamako by Bus (2012)
 Imagine That (2016)

With Rashied Ali
 At the Vision Festival (1999)

With Antonio Hart
 For Cannonball & Woody (1993)

References 

1971 births
Living people
Israeli jazz musicians
Jazz double-bassists
Israeli people of Moroccan-Jewish descent
Israeli people of Yemeni-Jewish descent
21st-century double-bassists
Jewish jazz musicians
Motéma Music artists
Fresh Sounds Records artists